Jalan Semambu, Federal Route 3486 (formerly Pahang and Terengganu state route C15 or T15), is an industrial federal road in Pahang and Terengganu state, Malaysia.

At most sections, the Federal Route 3486 was built under the JKR R5 road standard, with a speed limit of 90 km/h.

List of junctions

References

Malaysian Federal Roads